Lyca Jane Epe Gairanod (born November 21, 2004) is a Filipino singer and actress. She won the first season of The Voice Kids Philippines, where she landed a recording contract with MCA Music Inc. (Philippines) She subsequently made her first television appearance as an actress portraying herself in ABS-CBN's Maalaala Mo Kaya and guested in ABS-CBN's Hawak-Kamay the following month.

Early life
Gairanod was born on November 21, 2004 in Tanza, Cavite, Philippines. Her family collected plastic materials, bottles, and other recyclable items for added income. Her father was a fisherman, and her mother, Maria Nessel Gairanod, scavenged used bottles and old newspapers. Gairanod helped her mother and sang for her neighbors in exchange for money and food. Gairanod said she was not forced by her mother to find recyclable materials but wanted to help her family and earn an allowance.

==''The Voice Kids stint and championship==
During ABS-CBN's The Voice Kids season one auditions, which aired on May 8, 2014, Gairanod performed Aegis' "Halik". Coach Sarah Geronimo pressed the button for her. Coach Lea Salonga was supposed to press her button but did not because she felt that the two were "meant to be".

She advanced to the sing-off round by winning the battles round on July 12, 2014, against Isaac Zamudio and Lee Marcelino. They sang "Isang Lahi" by Regine Velasquez.

The battles round was followed by the sing-offs. Per team, two artists are chosen by their coaches for the live shows. Unlike in the battles where the coach picks the song for the artists, in the sing-offs, the song is chosen by the artists.

She advanced to the semi-finals after being chosen by Sarah Geronimo as one of the two would-be representatives of team Sarah among five contenders, performing the Tagalog version of Luther Vandross' "Dance with My Father".

She advanced to the finals after singing "Pangarap na Bituin" by her mentor Sarah Geronimo during the live semi-finals on July 19, 2014, in Newport Performing Arts Theater, Resorts World Manila, Pasay. She received the highest number of votes. While Salonga stated that the song is usually sung by persons who have dreams to fulfill, Geronimo said that the child is slowly reaching her dream, and that she could help her family escape from poverty.

The voting mechanics for the live finals is based on the accumulated votes per round: power ballad round, upbeat song round, and a duet with a celebrity round. Voting lines are opened between the end and the start of each round. At the end of the three rounds, all votes are tallied and the artist who gains the highest accumulated votes is declared the winner.

The first episode of the finals was opened by the top four artists with a medley rendition of Sponge Cola's "Bitiw", Rocksteddy's "Superhero", and Sandwich's "Sugod".

Gairanod sang Regine Velasquez's "Narito Ako" on the first round of the finals. She also sang Carly Rae Jepsen's "Call Me Maybe" on the second round and Aegis' "Basang-basa sa Ulan" on the third round. She was proclaimed the winner at the end of the competition.

Performances and results
 Studio Version of song charted

Career after The Voice Kids
TV guestings and appearances
After being the first grand champion of The Voice Kids season one, she had not attended the concert because the singer planned to expatriate in the United States. Only Darlene Vibares, Darren Espanto, and Juan Karlos Labajo attended the concert including the other finalists of the show. The concert was a charity event for the victims of Typhoon Glenda.

She appeared on Rated K with Darlene Vibares, where they shared how they fought poverty at an early age.

The four finalists of The Voice Kids, including Gairanod, Espanto, Vibares, and Labajo, appeared on ASAP 19. Gairanod sang "Halik".

Acting career
Gairanod started her acting career in the drama anthology show Maalaala Mo Kaya, where she acted as herself who was a junk scavenger.

Filmography
Television

Film

Reality and variety shows

Talk shows

Discography
Album

Singles

Chart performance

Concert

Accolades
 This is a list of awards, recognitions, achievements and nominations received by Lyca Gairanod''' during her career.

References

External links

 
Lyca Gairanod's profile in The Voice Kids

2004 births
Living people
The Voice Kids (Philippine TV series) contestants
ABS-CBN personalities
Star Magic
Viva Artists Agency
The Voice (franchise) winners
People from Tanza, Cavite
Singers from Cavite
Filipino child singers
Universal Music Group artists
Viva Records (Philippines) artists
21st-century Filipino singers
21st-century Filipino women singers